The Hollywood Reporters Power 100 (also known as Women in Entertainment Power 100) list, published annually since 1992, is a ranking of the 100 most powerful women in entertainment—film and television executives, agents, producers and occasionally performers. The list is made public in December during the magazine's yearly Women in Entertainment Breakfast. The factors on which the ranking is based have varied in the past. For example, the 2009 Power 100 took into account: achievements (box office, television ratings or dollars generated); overall authority within her company and Hollywood; greenlight power (ability to get a project made); and her standing within the industry.

Despite the existence of similar rankings, such as Forbess Celebrity 100 and Vanity Fairs New Establishment issue, the competition surrounding the Power 100 has remained substantial, particularly since Janice Min became chief creative officer at The Hollywood Reporter in 2010. In 2014, The New York Times called the Power 100 "one of the most fearsome competitions in show business," akin to the campaigns preceding the Academy Awards, adding that "for certain executives, agents and producers, this has become a blood sport."

Anne Sweeney, then co-chairman of Disney Media Networks, was named the most powerful woman in entertainment eight times between 2004 and 2013. Oprah Winfrey, chairman of Harpo Inc., and Amy Pascal, co-chairman of Sony Pictures Entertainment, were ranked in first place in 2008 and 2009 respectively. In 2014, NBCUniversal chairman Bonnie Hammer superseded Sweeney as the entertainment industry's most powerful woman.

Top Tens of the Power 100

References

Annual magazine issues
Lists of celebrities